The Caudron C.59 was a French, two-seat biplane with a single engine and a canvas-covered fuselage, produced between 1922 and 1924. Suitable for a variety of roles, more than 1,800 Caudron C.59s were manufactured.

Operational history
The Caudron C.59 was used in a variety of countries, including: France, Bulgaria, China, Finland, Turkey and in the Spanish Civil War.

Finland
The Finnish Air Force purchased three Caudron C.59s from France in 1923. The aircraft first carried the air force designation codes 2E3-2E5 and from 1927 on CA-48 – CA-50. The manufacturing numbers of the aircraft were 5407–5409. The aircraft were equipped with wheel landing gear, but at least one aircraft (2E3) was fitted with floats.  The aircraft were accepted into service on March 8, 1923 and the last one was taken out of service in 1931.

Variants
C.59 Original design.
59/2 Fitted with  Lorraine 7Ma Mizar radial engine.
C.77 Single-seat basic trainer version; intended for 1923 ET.1 competition 
C.320 c.1932, Original C.59s but refitted with  Renault 9A 9-cylinder radial engine. Some later returned to their original Hispano engines.

Survivors

Päijänne Tavastia Aviation Museum in Asikkala, Finland has one Caudron C.59 in storage.

Operators

Argentine Air Force

Brazilian Air Force

Bulgarian Air Force

Republic of China Air Force

French Air Force
French Navy

Finnish Air Force

Portuguese Air Force

Romanian Air Force

Spanish Republican Air Force

Spanish Air Force

Turkish Air Force

Venezuelan Air Force

Specifications (C.59)

See also

References

Further reading

External links

1920s French military trainer aircraft
C.059
Biplanes
Single-engined tractor aircraft